Cromack is a surname of English origin. The surname was first recorded in Yorkshire, England.

People with the surname include:

 Bernard Cromack (born 1937), former English cricketer 
 Sam Cromack (born 1989), lead vocalist and frontman of Australian indie rock band Ball Park Music
 Roy Cromack (1940–2017), English racing cyclist
 Vic Cromack (1920–1984), English professional footballer

References

Surnames of English origin